Shazia Khan is an Indian chef. She participated in MasterChef India (season 2), a cookery show that is hosted by STAR PLUS in India. She became the first Runner-Up of MasterChef India Season 2.

She is a member of the board of management, at Delhi Public School Bangalore North and Mysore. They run many educational institutes in Bangalore and Shazia involves herself in the education business.
She is daughter-in-law of the former Union Minister K Rahman Khan.

She has conducted cookery shows around the world, a television host, cookbook author “what's on the Menu, founder of The Cooking Studio, The Studio Cafe, Goa and Chennai.

Articles

 Article on Chef Shazia-
 Chef shazia khan smiling to glory-
 Chef Shazia in Varlifoodfestival-
 Article in Deccan Herald
 Article in Navdindtimes
 Article

References

Indian television chefs
Living people
Women chefs
Year of birth missing (living people)